A Horse's Tale is a 1906 novel written by American author Mark Twain (Samuel Clemens), written partially in the voice of Soldier Boy, who is Buffalo Bill's favorite horse, at a fictional frontier outpost with the U.S. 7th Cavalry.

Background

Harper's Magazine originally published the story in two installments in August and September 1906. Clemens wrote the story after receiving a request from actress Minnie Maddern Fiske to assist in her drive against bullfighting.  Harper's published the story as a 153-page book in October 1907.

Clemens's daughter Susy Clemens, who died in 1896 at age 24 of spinal meningitis, is understood to be the inspiration for lead character Cathy Alison. When Clemens provided the story to Harper's, he included a photograph of Susy for the illustrator to use for Cathy.

See also
Mark Twain bibliography

References

External links

 

Novels by Mark Twain
1907 American novels
Harper & Brothers books
Cultural depictions of Buffalo Bill
Novels about horses